Hugh C. Newsome was a teacher, postal clerk, city marshall, and state legislator in Arkansas. In 1887, he served in the Arkansas House of Representatives.

He served as a county judge from 1882 until 1884. He married.

See also
African-American officeholders during and following the Reconstruction era

References

Educators from Arkansas
Members of the Arkansas House of Representatives
Year of birth missing